The blackfin gulper shark (Centrophorus isodon) is a dogfish of the family Centrophoridae in the Northwest Pacific. Threats are not entirely clear but they may be bycatching from deepwater trawling and line fisheries and may also be used for cod liver oil and fish meal.

References

External links

blackfin gulper shark
Fauna of the Maldives
Fish of Sri Lanka
Fish of the Philippines
South China Sea
blackfin gulper shark